Potamotrygonocotyle uruguayensis is a species of monogenean flatworms, first described in 2007. It is a parasite, living in the gills of Short-tailed river stingrays (Potamotrygon brachyura).

The Latin name uruguayensis refers to the Uruguay River, in which it is found.

References

Fauna of Brazil
Animals described in 2007
Monopisthocotylea